The Marcel Duchamp Prize (in French : Prix Marcel Duchamp) is an annual award given to a young artist by the Association pour la Diffusion Internationale de l'Art Français (ADIAF).

The winner receives €35,000 personally and up to €30,000 in order to produce an exhibition of their work in the Modern Art museum (Centre Georges Pompidou).

The prize is named after the artist Marcel Duchamp.

History of the Marcel-Duchamp Prize 
In the early 1990s, an association was created, the ADIAF (Association for the international dissemination of French art), notably by Gilles Fuchs, international lawyer but also art collector, and by the gallery owner Daniel Templon, to participate in better promotion and distribution of the works of French visual artists. Launched by a group of five people, the ADIAF has nearly 400 members in 2020. You become a member by cooptation: you have to be a collector (but this criterion includes exceptions, in particular some gallery owners, brokers and art restorers) and be interested in the French art scene.

Prize winners

See also

 List of European art awards

References

External links
 Prix Marcel Duchamp official web page

Marcel Duchamp
Marcel Duchamp
French art awards